Ángel Grippa  is an Argentinian football goalkeeper who played for Argentina in the 1934 FIFA World Cup. He also played for Club Sportivo Alsina.

References

External links
FIFA profile

Argentine footballers
Argentina international footballers
Association football goalkeepers
1934 FIFA World Cup players
Argentine people of Italian descent
1914 births
Year of death missing